Riemke Ensing (born 1939) is a Dutch-born New Zealand poet. She has published and edited numerous books and is notable for synthesising European and New Zealand influences in her work.

Early life 
Ensing was born in Groningen, The Netherlands in 1939. She immigrated to New Zealand in 1951 at age twelve. She studied at Ardmore Teachers' Training College, then taught for two years, returning to the College to lecture in English literature for a year.

Career 
Ensing earned a master's degree in 1967, and was appointed to a position in Literature in the English Department at the University of Auckland. There she taught until 1999 when she took early retirement and was later appointed an Honorary Research Fellow (Faculty of Arts). In 2002 she was awarded a Sargeson Fellowship, sponsored by the law firm Buddle Findlay. She received an Honours List Award from the New Zealand Society of Authors in 2019.

In 1977, Ensing edited Private Gardens:  An Anthology of New Zealand Women Poets. It was the first anthology of women's verse published in New Zealand. She established her reputation with three books published in 1995: Dear Mr Sargeson was written in homage after visiting the cottage of the writer Frank Sargeson in Takapuna; Like I have seen the dark green ladder climbing was written about the paintings of Eion Stevens; in Gloria-in-Excelsis, Ensing edited the poems of Gloria Rawlinson. Her earlier poems showed European influences but during the 1980s and 1990s New Zealand influences and voices became more prominent. Ensing has an interest in art, publishing catalogues of exhibitions by Stanley Palmer in 1992 and Len Castle in 2008.

Works

Poetry books

Making Inroads – Invocation for the New Zealand Women's Convention, Hamilton, 1979, Coal Black Press, Auckland, 1980
Letters, The Lowry Press, University of Auckland, 1982
Topographies, (graphics by Nigel Brown) Prometheus Press, Auckland, 1984
Spells from Chagall, The Griffin Press, Panmure, Auckland, 1987
The K.M. File and Other Poems with Katherine Mansfield, Hazard Press, Christchurch, Melbourne, 1993.
Like I Have Seen The Dark Green Ladder Climbing, The Pear Tree Press, Auckland, 1995
Dear Mr. Sargeson..., Cape Catley, Whatamango Bay, Queen Charlotte Sound, 1995
Finding the Ancestors – poems to celebrate the occasion of the first Dutch Language and Culture Conference of its kind in New Zealand, Pear Tree Press, Auckland, May 1999.
Tarawera Te Maunga Tapu, The Pear Tree Press, Auckland, 1999
Talking Pictures–Selected Poems, HeadworX, Wellington, 2000
Storm warning, after McCahon : poems, R. Ensing, Auckland, 2003
This is a man who has bared his soul, Pear Tree Press, Auckland, 2007
Black, Green Bay Press, Auckland, 2010
If only, Pear Tree Press, Auckland, 2017

Edited

Private Gardens–an anthology of New Zealand Women Poets, Caveman Press, Dunedin, 1977
Poetry NZ 5, Brick Row Publishers, Auckland, 1992
Gloria in Excelsis–a selection of poems by Gloria Rawlinson– in celebration, The Pear Tree Press, Auckland, 1995

References

External links
New Zealand Electronic Poetry Centre page on Ensing
Interview with Riemke Ensing for the Cultural Icons project. Audio.
Photo of Riemke Ensing and Gloria Rawlinson, 1995, in Te Ara

1939 births
Living people
People from Groningen (city)
20th-century New Zealand poets
New Zealand women poets
University of Auckland alumni
Dutch emigrants to New Zealand
20th-century New Zealand women writers